Piotr Przybecki (born 7 August 1972) is a retired Polish handball player and current coach for VfL Lübeck-Schwartau.

He was a member of the Polish handball team at the 2004 European Men's Handball Championship in Slovenia.

References

External links 
  
  

Polish male handball players
Living people
1972 births
Vive Kielce players
HSG Nordhorn-Lingen players
Handball-Bundesliga players
Polish handball coaches
Handball coaches of international teams